The 1997 Nehru Cup was held in Kochi, India. The Nehru Cup is an international association football tournament, organised by the All India Football Federation, which was launched in 1982. Participating nations in 1997 were Iraq, China, India, Ghana and Uzbekistan. The winner of the Nehru Cup was Iraq, whilst India did not record a single win, in drawing three matches and losing one. In the semi final match, more than 60,000 tickets were sold.

Matches

Knock-out stage

Semi-finals

Third place match

Final

Winners

Statistics

Goalscorers

References

Nehru Cup
1996–97 in Iraqi football
1996–97 in Indian football
1996–97 in Ghanaian football
1997 in Chinese football
1997 in Uzbekistani football
1997 in Asian football